
Gmina Goniądz is an urban-rural gmina (administrative district) in Mońki County, Podlaskie Voivodeship, in north-eastern Poland.

Villages
Apart from the town of Goniądz, Gmina Goniądz contains the villages and settlements of Białosuknia, Budne, Budne-Żarnowo, Dawidowizna, Doły, Downary, Klewianka, Kramkówka Duża, Kramkówka Mała, Krzecze, Łazy, Mierkienniki, Olszowa Droga, Osowiec, Owieczki, Piwowary, Płochowo, Smogorówka Dolistowska, Smogorówka Goniądzka, Szafranki, Uścianek, Wojtówstwo, Wólka Piaseczna and Wroceń.

Neighbouring gminas
Gmina Goniądz is bordered by the gminas of Bargłów Kościelny, Grajewo, Jaświły, Mońki, Radziłów, Rajgród, Sztabin and Trzcianne.

References
Polish official population figures 2006

Goniadz
Mońki County